Symphony No. 42  is a 2014 Hungarian animated short film directed by Réka Bucsi. The film had its premiere at the Berlinale Shorts Competition. It is adapted as a segment in the FXX anthology series Cake.

Plot
The short consists of 47 loosely connected scenes revolving around the "irrational connections between human and nature".

Awards and nominations
38th Hong Kong International Film Festival – Special Mention for Best Short Film (2014)
Friss Hús Budapest International Short Film Festival – Best Hungarian Short Film (2014)
Primanima World Festival of First Animations – George Pal Prize, Best Graduation Film (2014)
Anilogue International Animation Festival – Audience Award and Special Jury Mention (2014)
Hiroshima International Animation Festival – Hiroshima Prize (2014)
3. Kyiv International Short Film Festival – Best Film Award, Audience Award (2014)
50th Chicago International Film Festival – Gold Plaque (2014)
Vilnius International Film Festival – Best Short Film (2015)

References

External links
 
 

2014 short films
2014 films
2014 animated films
2010s animated short films
Hungarian animated short films
Animated documentary films
Animated films without speech